Big Butt Mountain or Big Butt are the names of five distinct mountains in Western North Carolina. Butt in this context is a corruption of butte.

Buncombe County 

Big Butt Mountain is a summit in Buncombe and Haywood counties.
Big Butt is a summit in Buncombe and Yancey counties.

Haywood County 
Big Butt is a summit inside the Great Smoky Mountains National Park in Haywood County, North Carolina.

Macon County 

Big Butt is a summit in Macon County.

Madison County 
Big Butt is a summit on the border of North Carolina and Greene County, Tennessee.

References

Mountains of Buncombe County, North Carolina
Mountains of Haywood County, North Carolina
Mountains of North Carolina